Michele Val Jean (b. 1950s) is an American television writer on the CBS Daytime soap opera The Bold and the Beautiful.

Career
In 2000 she was promoted, alongside Elizabeth Korte, to the post of head writer, making her the first African American in the history of daytime television serials to hold the post. 

Val Jean wrote the critically acclaimed 1998 re-visitation of Luke Spencer's rape of Laura Spencer, the rape of Elizabeth Webber, Luke and Laura Spencer's 2006 wedding.

Since 2012 she is a script writer of The Bold and the Beautiful.

Positions held
Ambitions Will Packer Media OWN Network 
Consulting Producer Aug 2018–present 

The Bold and the Beautiful
Script writer: January 16, 2012 – present

General Hospital
Occasional breakdown writer: February 2007 – December 26, 2007
Co-head writer: January 2001 – April 2001
Breakdown writer: 1996–2000
Occasional script writer: 1996–2000
Script writer: 1993–1996, 2002 – December 21, 2007, April 7, 2008 – January 10, 2012
Script editor: 1993–1995 (hired by Claire Labine)

Generations (hired by Sally Sussman Morina)
Script Writer: 1989–1990

Port Charles
Occasional Script Writer: 1997–1998

Santa Barbara (hired by Bridget and Jerome Dobson)
Breakdown writer: 1992–1993
Script Writer: 1991
Script Editor: 1992–1993

Jake and the Fatman

Awards and nominations
Val Jean has been nominated for several Daytime Emmy Awards.

Writers Guild Of America Award
1993–1998 seasons, 6 nominations for General Hospital
1991 and 1992 seasons, 2 nominations for Santa Barbara

TV Guide
Best Daytime Soap Writer (2004, 2006 & 2007)

Head writer tenures

External links
 ABC Daytime: General Hospital
 
SoapCentral
NewYorkTimes
ThomRacina
AlternativeFilmGuide: 2008 WGA Awards

American soap opera writers
American women television writers
American screenwriters
1950s births
Living people
Place of birth missing (living people)
Women soap opera writers
21st-century American women